Juan José Marino was a Mexican film editor.

Selected filmography
 Luponini from Chicago (1935)
 Beautiful Mexico (1938)
 The Coward (1939)
 The Museum of Crime (1945)
 Murder in the Studios (1946)
 Gangster's Kingdom (1948)
 Madam Temptation (1948)
 Juan Charrasqueado (1948)
 The Masked Tiger (1951)
 Arrabalera (1951)
 Passionflower (1952)
 The Island of Women (1953)

References

Bibliography 
 Kim R. Holston. Susan Hayward: Her Films and Life. McFarland, 2002.

External links 
 

Year of birth missing
20th-century births
2019 deaths
Mexican film editors